The 2019 Western Athletic Conference women's soccer tournament was the postseason women's soccer tournament for the Western Athletic Conference held from November 6 to November 10, 2019. The five match tournament took place at Championship Field in Seattle, Washington on the campus of Seattle University. The six-team single-elimination tournament consisted of three rounds based on seeding from regular season conference play. The defending champions were the Seattle Redhawks, who successfully defended their title, defeating Utah Valley 2–1 in the final. This was the fifth WAC women's soccer tournament championship for the Seattle women's soccer program, all of which have come under head coach Julie Woodward.

Bracket

Source:

Schedule

First Round

Semifinals

Final

Statistics

Goalscorers 
2 Goals
 Amber Tripp (Utah Valley)

1 Goal
 Lauren Brown (Seattle)
 Jocelyn Bybee (Utah Valley)
 Katie Haskins (Utah Valley)
 Claire Larson (Kansas City)
 Leahi Manthei (Seattle)
 Lindsey Prokop (Kansas City)
 Jessie Ray (Seattle)
 Amanda Sampson (Kansas City)
 Eszter Toth (CSU Bakersfield)
 Emily Zapata (UT Rio Grande Valley)

All-Tournament team

Source:

MVP in bold

References 

Western Athletic Conference women's soccer seasons
tournament 2019
Western Athletic Conference Women's Soccer